Sushmita Dev (born 25 September 1972) is an Indian politician and member of Rajya Sabha from West Bengal, and belongs to the All India Trinamool Congress. Previously, she was elected to the Lok Sabha, lower house of the Parliament of India from Silchar, Assam in the 2014 Indian general election as a member of the Indian National Congress. She is the former president of All India Mahila Congress. She lost the 2019 Lok Sabha Election by a huge margin to BJP candidate Rajdeep Roy, which led her to resign from Indian National Congress and to join the All India Trinamool Congress in 2021.

Early life 
Dev is the daughter of the veteran Indian National Congress leader Santosh Mohan Dev and her mother is Bithika Dev, a legislator of Silchar of Assam assembly. Her father was a Member of Parliament and Cabinet Minister of India.

She holds a B.A.(Hons.) from Miranda House, Bar-at-Law, an LLB (Corporate and Commercial Laws) from University of Delhi. She enrolled at Inns of Courts School of Law, London and King's College London, U.K.

References

External links
 Sushmita Dev says joining TMC not compromise on ideology
Official biographical sketch in Parliament of India website

1972 births
Living people
Delhi University alumni
Alumni of King's College London
India MPs 2014–2019
Bengali Hindus
Women in Assam politics
People from Silchar
Indian National Congress politicians from Assam
21st-century Indian women politicians
21st-century Indian politicians
Women members of the Lok Sabha
Trinamool Congress politicians
Women members of the Rajya Sabha